Luís Filipe de Menezes Lopes (born 2 November 1953) is a Portuguese politician.

Background
He is a son of José António Lopes (Porto, Alvar, 10 September 1925 –), an Industrialist (son and paternal grandson of cattle dealers and maternal grandson and great-grandson of farmers and maternal grandson of an exposed daughter of unknown parents), and wife (m. Coimbra, Sé Nova, 11 November 1949) Maria Helena de Menezes Borges (Viseu, Abraveses, Aguieira, 15 April 1928 –), a Licentiate in Philosophy from the Faculty of Letters of the University of Porto and a High School Teacher, whose paternal grandfather was Spanish and whose mother was from the local Nobility.

Career
He is a Licentiate in Medicine specialized in pediatrics from the Faculty of Medicine of the University of Porto.

He started his career as a medical doctor.

Affiliated with the Social Democratic Party (PSD), he was a Secretary of State for Parliamentary Affairs and from 1997 to 2013 he was Mayor of the Municipal Chamber of Vila Nova de Gaia municipality (in Greater Porto subregion), one of the most populated Portuguese municipalities.

He was leader of the Social Democratic Party (SDP, PSD in Portuguese) between September 2007 and 31 May 2008. He was elected after Luís Marques Mendes and was succeeded by Manuela Ferreira Leite.

Meneses is considered a populist, his policies as mayor were equally populist and his victory over Marques Mendes is considered a victory of populism in the SDP, as there was a clear difference between the positions of both, having Meneses a more politically correct and pro-people position in most matters, although with a sightly neoliberal stance on the health care system, and a liberal conservative position towards gay rights.

Luis Filipe Menezes is considered as a modern politician. He had the best score in last Municipality elections of October 2009.

Family
He married in Porto Civilly at the 2nd Conservatory of the Civil Register of Porto on 20 March 1980 and Religiously in Porto, Bonfim, on 7 May 1980 to Maria Cândida Valanzuela de Sampayo Tavares, born in Porto, Ramalde, on 7 November 1956, daughter of Amândio Gómez de Sampayo Tavares (Porto, Cedofeita, 26 December 1928), a Cathedratic Professor of the Faculty of Medicine of the University of Porto, etc., and the Proprietor of the House of O Carballal in San Cristovo de Mourentán, Arbo, Pontevedra, Galicia, son of a Galician mother, and wife (m. 11 September 1952) María del Carmen Valanzuela y Simón (30 July 1923 –), a Galician paternal granddaughter of an unknown paternal grandfather, and had issue, three sons: 
 Luís Filipe Valanzuela Tavares de Menezes Lopes (born 20 December 1980)
 Pedro Miguel Valanzuela Tavares de Menezes Lopes (born 16 June 1982), married Ana Benvinda de Miranda de Andrade de Albuquerque d' Orey (born 12 October 1979)
 João Francisco Valanzuela Tavares de Menezes Lopes (born 22 September 1993)

Electoral history

PSD leadership election, 2007

|- style="background-color:#E9E9E9"
! align="center" colspan=2 style="width:  60px"|Candidate
! align="center" style="width:  50px"|Votes
! align="center" style="width:  50px"|%
|-
|bgcolor=orange|
| align=center | Luís Filipe Menezes
| align=center | 20,701
| align=center | 54.1
|-
|bgcolor=orange|
| align=center | Luís Marques Mendes
| align=center | 16,334
| align=center | 42.7
|-
|bgcolor=white|
| align=center | Blank/Invalid Ballots
| align=center | 1,235
| align=center | 3.2
|-
|- style="background-color:#E9E9E9"
| colspan=2 style="text-align:center;" |   Turnout
| align=center | 38,270
| align=center | 60.71
|-
|}

  (Source: Official results)

References

External links
  his web site

1953 births
Living people
Social Democratic Party (Portugal) politicians
Members of the Assembly of the Republic (Portugal)
Mayors of places in Portugal
People from Ovar
University of Porto alumni